Oakhurst is a locality in the Fraser Coast Region, Queensland, Australia.

History 
Originally Oakhurst was split between the Shire of Woocoo and the City of Maryborough. However, on 2 July 2010, it was regazetted as being solely within the Fraser Coast Region.

Geography
The Mary River forms part of the south-east boundary.

Road infrastructure
The Maryborough–Biggenden Road (State Route 86) runs through from east to west.

References 

Fraser Coast Region
Localities in Queensland